Arcus may refer to:

Businesses and organizations
ARCUS, the Arctic Research Consortium of the United States, supporting Arctic policy in the U.S.
Arcus AS, a Norwegian producer of liquor
Arcus Co., a Bulgarian firearm manufacturer
Arcus Foundation, supporting great apes and LGBT rights
Arcus-Air, a German airline

Gliders
Schempp-Hirth Arcus a two-seat glider
Pegas Arcus, a Czech paraglider design
Swing Arcus, German paraglider design

Human anatomy
 Arcus anterior atlantis
 Arcus aortae
 Arcus corneae
 Arcus costalis
 Arcus dentalis
 Arcus dentalis mandibularis
 Arcus dentalis maxillaris
 Arcus ductus thoracici
 Arcus iliopectineus
 Arcus inguinalis
 Arcus lumbocostalis lateralis
 Arcus lumbocostalis medialis
 Arcus palatini
 Arcus palatoglossus
 Arcus palatopharyngeus
 Arcus palmaris profundus
 Arcus palmaris superficialis
 Arcus pedis longitudinalis pars lateralis
 Arcus pedis longitudinalis pars medialis
 Arcus pedis transversalis
 Arcus plantaris
 Arcus plantaris profundus
 Arcus posterior atlantis
 Arcus pubis
 Arcus tendineus fasciae pelvis
 Arcus unguium
 Arcus venosus dorsalis pedis
 Arcus venosus jugularis
 Arcus venosus palmaris profundus
 Arcus venosus palmaris superficialis
 Arcus venosus plantaris
 Arcus volaris profundus
 Arcus volaris superficialis

Video games
Arcus II: Silent Symphony
Arcus Odyssey
Arcus (video game), see List of X68000 games

Other uses
Arcus cloud formation
Agfa Arcus scanners
Arcus (planetary geology) (pl. arcūs), an arc-shaped feature
Arcus senilis, age-related change in the iris
Arcus (satellite), a proposed X-ray space telescope
Inverse trigonometric functions, also called arcus or arc functions 
Arcus Argentariorum, an arch of San Giorgio al Velabro Church, Rome, Italy
Arcus, the main protagonist of the webcomic Acception